Megaodynerus is a monotypic indomalayan genus of potter wasps. The only known species, Megaodynerus maximus, was described from Laos.

References

 Gusenleitner, J. 2012. Bemerkenswerte Faltenwespen-Funde aus der orientalischen Region Teil 6 (Hymenoptera: Vespidae, Eumeninae). Linzer Biologischer Beiträge 44 (2): 1045–1052.

Potter wasps
Monotypic Hymenoptera genera